Waverly Municipal Airport (FAA LID: C25) is in Waverly, Iowa, United States, on 35th Street approximately 2 nautical miles away from the city center. 

The airport is owned and maintained by the City of Waverly. It is a public use airport and can service a wide variety of small single and multi-engine piston and turboprop aircraft.

Current use 
The airport mostly sees use by transient air traffic and agricultural aircraft. A small number of aircraft are permanently based here. A small set of hangars are located near the FBO/maintenance building. Waverly Municipal Airport is frequently used for crop dusting and other agricultural aviation purposes. It is also home to a maintenance facility capable of doing major airframe maintenance and overhaul on small to mid-size general aviation aircraft.

Airport services 
Waverly Municipal Airport offers multiple services on site from multiple companies. These include:

 Swieter Aircraft - Airframe, engine, and aircraft systems maintenance/overhaul provider
 Waverly Air Service - Fixed-base operator (FBO) based at the airport, responsible for providing fuel and hangar/tie-down services
 Iowa Flight Training - Offers flight lessons and pilot training materials
 McCandless Aircraft and Avionics - Aircraft parts and avionics dealer and installer

Self-service fuel is also available to aircraft at the airport; only 100LL AvGas is sold.

Runway 
Waverly Municipal Airport has one runway. Its east end is at heading 287° and its west end is at heading 107°. The east end of the runway is marked 29 and the west end is marked 11. The runway is 3,201ft long and made from concrete. Lights are installed on the runway for safe nighttime operations. The runway is long enough to land all small single-engine piston aircraft and most multi-engine piston aircraft. Most types of single-engine turboprop aircraft can also land safely, as well as some small multi-engine turboprop aircraft. The runway can support a select few very light jets, but the airport does not provide Jet A1 fuel for these aircraft.

References 

 C25 - Waverly Municipal Airport. (n.d.). Retrieved March 31, 2021, from https://www.airnav.com/airport/C25
 Aircraft, S. (n.d.). Swieteraircraft.com. Retrieved March 31, 2021, from https://swieteraircraft.com/
 SkyVector. (n.d.). C25 - Waverly Municipal Airport. Retrieved March 31, 2021, from https://skyvector.com/airport/C25/Waverly-Municipal-Airport

Airports in Iowa
Waverly, Iowa
Transportation in Bremer County, Iowa
Buildings and structures in Bremer County, Iowa
Year of establishment missing